Sir John Glynne's Canal was a canal in England built by Sir John Glynne. It ran from Saltney, just outside Chester to Bretton, a distance of about one mile. It was built about 1768, and was in use until 1779. It was used for the transportation of coal from mines in Flintshire into Chester.

References

See also

Canals of the United Kingdom

Canals in Cheshire
Canals opened in 1768
1768 establishments in England